Rift House is an area of south-west Hartlepool in the borough of Hartlepool, County Durham, England. It has a secondary school with a sixth-form college and two primary schools; English Martyrs, Kingsley and Rift House. It was a ward of the town for the 2011 UK Census, for the 2015 UK general election it was split between two wards Manor House (with Owton) and Foggy Furze.

References

Hartlepool
Places in the Tees Valley